Strymon martialis, known generally as martial scrub hairstreak, is a species of hairstreak in the butterfly family Lycaenidae. Other common names include the Cuban gray hairstreak and martial hairstreak.

The MONA or Hodges number for Strymon martialis is 4340.

References

Further reading

External links

 

Eumaeini
Articles created by Qbugbot
Butterflies described in 1864